The following tables compare general and technical information between a number of notable IRC client programs which have been discussed in independent, reliable prior published sources.

General 
Basic general information about the notableclients: creator/company, license, etc. Clients listed on a light purple background are no longer in active development.

Release history 
A brief overview of the release history.

Operating system support
The operating systems on which the clients can run natively (without emulation).

Unix and Unix-like operating systems:
 Unix (BSD): 386BSD, BSD/OS, FreeBSD, NetBSD, OpenBSD, SunOS, ULTRIX
 Unix (System V): AIX, A/UX, HP-UX, IRIX, SCO OpenServer, Solaris, UnixWare
 Unix-like: Linux, NeXTSTEP, OpenVMS, OSF/1, QNX, Tru64 UNIX

Protocol support 
What IRC related protocols and standards are supported by each client.

Direct Client-to-Client (DCC) support 
The Direct Client-to-Client Protocol (DCC) has been the primary method of establishing connections directly between IRC clients for a long time now. Once established, DCC connections bypass the IRC network and servers, allowing for all sorts of data to be transferred between clients including files and direct chat sessions.

IRCv3 Support 
This software is compliant natively; other software may be compliant with extensions.

IRCv3 SASL Mechanisms 
IRC SASL authentication primarily uses the same mechanisms as SASL in other protocols. Most commonly:
 PLAIN as defined by RFC 4616
 EXTERNAL as defined by RFC 4422
 SCRAM-SHA-256 as defined by RFC 7677

Features 
Information on what features each of the clients support.

See also 
 Comparison of cross-platform instant messaging clients
 Comparison of user features of messaging platforms
 Comparison of instant messaging protocols
 Comparison of mobile IRC clients
 Comparison of VoIP software
 List of SIP software
 Comparison of LAN messengers

References 

 
Internet Relay Chat clients
Internet Relay Chat clients